Bamford is an English surname. Notable people with the surname include:

Brian Bamford (1935–2021), English golfer
Edward Bamford (1887–1928), English naval captain and recipient of the Victoria Cross
Frank Ellis Bamford (1865–1932), American army general
Fred Bamford (1849–1934), Australian politician, Minister for Home and Territories
Gord Bamford (born 1976), Australian-Canadian singer
Harry Bamford (1920–1958), English footballer 
Harry Bamford (footballer, born 1886) (1886—1915), English footballer
Harry Bamford (footballer, born 1914) (1914—1949), English footballer
James Bamford (born 1946), American author and journalist
John Bamford (born 1937), English recipient of the George Cross
Joseph Cyril Bamford (1916–2001), English businessman
Joyce Bamford-Addo (born 1937), Ghanaian lawyer and politician
Maria Bamford (born 1970), American comedian and actress
Mark Bamford (film director), American writer and director
Patrick Bamford (born 1993), English footballer
Robert Bamford (1883–1942), founder of Aston Martin
Samuel Bamford (1788–1872), English radical reformer and writer
Simon Bamford (born–?), English film, television and stage actor.
Tommy Bamford (1905–1967), Welsh footballer

Surnames
English-language surnames
Surnames of English origin
Surnames of British Isles origin